Bocchoris trivitralis is a moth in the family Crambidae. It was described by Charles Swinhoe in 1895. It is found in India, Sri Lanka, Taiwan and Japan.

References

Moths described in 1895
Spilomelinae